The Criminal Law Act 1826 (7 Geo 4 c 64) is an Act of the Parliament of the United Kingdom. It was a consolidation Act. It consolidated a large number of Acts relating to criminal procedure. It was due to Sir Robert Peel (see Peel's Acts).

It formerly dealt with the preliminary examination and committal of accused persons by justices, the taking of depositions, the form of indictments, and the costs of prosecutions.

See also abatement in pleading.

Preamble
The preamble was repealed by the Statute Law Revision Act 1890.

Sections 1 to 27
Section 1 was repealed by the Statute Law Revision Act 1950.

Sections 2 and 3 were repealed by section 34 of the Indictable Offences Act 1848.

Section 4 was repealed by section 45 of, and Schedule 3 to, the Coroners Act 1887.

Sections 5 and 6 were repealed by the Statute Law Revision Act 1950.

Sections 7 and 8 were repealed by the Statute Law Revision Act 1873.

Sections 9 to 11 were repealed by section 1 of, the Schedule to, 24 & 25 Vict c 95 (1861).

Sections 12 and 13 were repealed by section 56(4) of, and Part IV of Schedule 11 to, the Courts Act 1971.

Sections 14 to 16 were repealed by section 9 of, and Schedule 2 to, the Indictments Act 1915.

Section 17 was repealed by the Statute Law Revision Act 1950.

Sections 18 and 19 were repealed by section 9 of, and Schedule 2 to, the Indictments Act 1915.

Section 20 was repealed by the Statute Law Revision Act 1873.

Section 21 was repealed by section 56(4) of, and Part I of Schedule 11 to, the Courts Act 1971.

Sections 22 to 25 were repealed by section 10 of, and the Schedule to, the Costs in Criminal Cases Act 1908.

Section 26 was repealed by section 4 of the Criminal Justice Administration Act 1851.

Section 27 was repealed by section 10 of, and the Schedule to, the Merchant Shipping (Expences) Act 1882.

Section 28 - Courts may order compensation to those who have been active in the apprehension of certain offenders
This section originally read:

It now reads:

The words of enactment at the start were repealed by the Statute Law Revision (No. 2) Act 1890.

The words "the Crown Court" were substituted by section 56(1) of, and paragraph 2 of Schedule 8 to, the Courts Act 1971. This was consequential on the creation of the Crown Court and the abolition of its predecessors by that Act.

The words "an arrestable offence" (which are not printed in the amended text above because they have been replaced) and the words "that offence" were substituted by section 10(1) of, and paragraph 3(1) of Schedule 2 to, the Criminal Law Act 1967. This was consequential on the creation of the classification arrestable offence by that Act. The words "an indictable offence" were substituted for the words "an arrestable offence" by section 111 of, and paragraph 39 of Part 3 of Schedule 7 to, the Serious Organised Crime and Police Act 2005. This was consequential on the abolition of the classification arrestable offence by that Act.

The words after "and where any Person shall appear to any Court of Sessions of the Peace, to have been active in or towards the Apprehension of any Party charged with receiving Stolen Property knowing the same to have been stolen, such Court shall have Power to order Compensation to such Person in the same Manner as the other Courts herein-before mentioned" were repealed by sections 10(1) and (2) of, and paragraph 3(1) of Schedule 2 to, and Part III of Schedule 3 to, the Criminal Law Act 1967.

The proviso to this section was repealed by the Statute Law (Repeals) Act 1998.

"Sheriff"

Sheriffs appointed for a county or Greater London are now known as high sheriffs, and any reference in any enactment or instrument to a sheriff must be construed accordingly in relation to sheriffs for a county or Greater London.

The following cases are relevant to this section:
 R v Barnes (1835) 7 C & P 166
 R v Jones (1835) 7 C & P 167
 R v Womersly (1836) 2 Lew CC 162
 R v Haines (1850) 5 Cox CC 114
 R v Dunning (1851) 17 LTOS 8, (1851) 5 Cox CC 142
 R v Platt and Sines (1905) 69 JP 424

Section 29 - Such orders to be paid by the Sheriff, who may obtain immediate repayment on application to the Treasury

The words of enactment at the start were repealed by the Statute Law Revision (No. 2) Act 1888.

The words "upon being paid for the same the sum of 25p and no more" in the second place were repealed on 19 November 1998 by section 1(1) of, and Group 2 of Part 1 of Schedule 1 to the Statute Law (Repeals) Act 1998.

The words before "Lord Chancellor" were repealed by the Statute Law Revision Act 1890.

The words "Lord Chancellor" were substituted by article 4(a) of the Transfer of Functions (Treasury and Lord Chancellor) Order 1976 (S.I. 1976/229)

"Sheriff"

Sheriffs appointed for a county or Greater London are now known as high sheriffs, and any reference in any enactment or instrument to a sheriff must be construed accordingly in relation to sheriffs for a county or Greater London.

Sections 30 to 32
Section 30 was repealed by section 170 of, and paragraph 1 of Schedule 15 to, and Schedule 16 to, the Criminal Justice Act 1988.

Section 31 was repealed by section 56(4) of, and Part IV of Schedule 11 to, the Courts Act 1971.

Section 32 was repealed by the Statute Law Revision Act 1873.

See also
Criminal Law Act

References
 Archbold Criminal Pleading, Evidence and Practice, 1999, para 5-585 to 5-586
 John Mounteney Lely. "The Criminal Law Act, 1826". The Statutes of Practical Utility. (Chitty's Statutes). Fifth Edition. Sweet and Maxwell. Stevens and Sons. London. 1894. Volume 3. Title "Criminal Law". Pages 12 to 20.

External links
The Criminal Law Act 1826, as amended from the National Archives.
The Criminal Law Act 1826, as originally enacted from the National Archives.

United Kingdom Acts of Parliament 1826
Criminal law of the United Kingdom